Achénouma, also spelled Achinouma, is an administrative village located in Agadez Region, Niger. Achénouma is not one of Niger's 255 communes, and is geographically located within the commune of Dirkou.

Geography 
Achénouma is located along the Kaouar escarpment, which is the location of multiple oases leading to an "island of civilization" in the Sahara Desert. The town is located approximately 15 kilometres north of Dirkou, near the mountain Tima. The mountain has served as a fortified refuge, and has also been known as Ayyama. The village's saltworks, called Ayemma, can be found four kilometres from Tima. Salt and soda ash production are an important part of the local economy.

Inhabitants 
Achénouma is largely inhabited by former slaves of the Teda ethnic group.

Climate 
Achénouma has an arid climate, or BWh under the Köppen climate classification.

References 

Populated places in Niger